James Scott is a retired American football  coach. He served as the head football coach at Aurora University from 1986 to 2004.  Scott revitalized a program that hadn't fielded a team since 1951.  After his retirement from coaching, Scott remained on staff at Aurora as an algebra instructor.

Head coaching record

References

Year of birth missing (living people)
Living people
Aurora Spartans football coaches
Aurora University faculty
Illinois State University alumni
Luther Norse football players